Hekaton may refer to:
Hekatonkheires, three giants in Greek mythology
Hekaton (database), an in-memory database for OLTP